Byasa daemonius is a butterfly described by Sergei Alphéraky in 1895. It is found in Tibet and western China, that belongs to the windmills genus Byasa, comprising tailed black swallowtail butterflies with white spots and red submarginal crescents.

Subspecies
Byasa daemonius daemonius
Byasa daemonius yunnana (Oberthür, 1907) (Yunnan)

Status
Very little information is available and none on current status. Further research is required.

References

 

Byasa
Butterflies described in 1895
Butterflies of Asia